DXRC-TV is a commercial relay television station owned and operated by GMA Network Inc. Its transmitter is located at Capitol Hill, Brgy. Telaje, Tandag City.

GMA TV-2 Tandag current programs
 One Mindanao (simulcast on TV-5 Davao)
 At Home with GMA Regional TV (simulcast on TV-5 Davao)
 Biyaheng DO30 (simulcast on TV-5 Davao)

References

See also
 DXMJ-TV
 List of GMA Network stations

GMA Network stations
Television channels and stations established in 1995
Television stations in Surigao del Sur